Jefferson Frankford Hospital is a non-profit hospital located in Philadelphia and is a part of Jefferson Health Northeast, a multi-state non-profit health system now a part of Jefferson Health. The hospital serve as a general hospital of Aria-Jefferson Health and has a Level II trauma center. It is the oldest hospital in the Jefferson Health Northeast system. It is also a clinical affiliate of the New York Institute of Technology College of Osteopathic Medicine and the Rowan-Virtua School of Osteopathic Medicine and provides clinical clerkship education to the medical schools' osteopathic medical students.

History
Jefferson Frankford Hospital opened on July 4, 1903 a year after Dr. Joseph Ball founded Aria Health System. The Frankford campus is a general medical and surgical hospital with 485 beds.  In the last year with data available, the hospital had 131,188 emergency department visits, and performed 7,686 inpatient and 11,561 outpatient surgeries.

Jefferson Frankford Hospital was named one of 18 Philadelphia region hospitals that made Healthgrades' top 250 hospitals for 2019. In the same year Eddie Welsh, a nurse at Frankford, founded Project Cotton to "clothe discharged patients in need".

References

External links
 
 Jefferson Health System

Hospitals in Philadelphia
Teaching hospitals in Pennsylvania
Market East, Philadelphia